In the branch of mathematics known as integration theory, the McShane integral, created by Edward J. McShane, is a modification of the Henstock-Kurzweil integral. The McShane integral is equivalent to Lebesgue integral.

Definition

Free tagged partition 

 

where

 

and each tag .

The fact that the tags are allowed to be outside the subintervals is why the partition is called free. It's also the only difference between the definitions of the Henstock-Kurzweil integral and the McShane integral.

For a function  and a free tagged partition , define

Gauge 
A positive function  is called a gauge in this context.

We say that a free tagged partition  is -fine if for all 

 

Intuitively, the gauge controls the widths of the subintervals. Like with the Henstock-Kurzweil integral, this provides flexibility (especially near problematic points) not given by the Riemann integral.

McShane integral 

See also 

 Henstock-Kurzweil integral

References 

  
Definitions of mathematical integration